Moscow City Duma District 30 is one of 45 constituencies in Moscow City Duma. The constituency covers parts of Southern Moscow since 2014. In 1993-2005 District 30 was based in Western Moscow, however, after the number of constituencies was reduced to 15 in 2005, the constituency was eliminated.

Members elected

Election results

2001

|-
! colspan=2 style="background-color:#E9E9E9;text-align:left;vertical-align:top;" |Candidate
! style="background-color:#E9E9E9;text-align:left;vertical-align:top;" |Party
! style="background-color:#E9E9E9;text-align:right;" |Votes
! style="background-color:#E9E9E9;text-align:right;" |%
|-
|style="background-color:"|
|align=left|Aleksandr Tarnavsky
|align=left|Independent
|
|41.52%
|-
|style="background-color:"|
|align=left|Leonid Olshansky
|align=left|Independent
|
|20.45%
|-
|style="background-color:"|
|align=left|Aleksey Suloyev
|align=left|Independent
|
|9.86%
|-
|style="background-color:#F21A29"|
|align=left|Oleg Shmatov
|align=left|Russian United Industrial Party
|
|6.45%
|-
|style="background-color:"|
|align=left|Yevgeny Yankovsky
|align=left|Independent
|
|2.41%
|-
|style="background-color:#000000"|
|colspan=2 |against all
|
|15.46%
|-
| colspan="5" style="background-color:#E9E9E9;"|
|- style="font-weight:bold"
| colspan="3" style="text-align:left;" | Total
| 
| 100%
|-
| colspan="5" style="background-color:#E9E9E9;"|
|- style="font-weight:bold"
| colspan="4" |Source:
|
|}

2014

|-
! colspan=2 style="background-color:#E9E9E9;text-align:left;vertical-align:top;" |Candidate
! style="background-color:#E9E9E9;text-align:left;vertical-align:top;" |Party
! style="background-color:#E9E9E9;text-align:right;" |Votes
! style="background-color:#E9E9E9;text-align:right;" |%
|-
|style="background-color:"|
|align=left|Aleksey Mishin
|align=left|Independent
|
|50.61%
|-
|style="background-color:"|
|align=left|Denis Davydov
|align=left|Communist Party
|
|17.06%
|-
|style="background-color:"|
|align=left|Yelena Repkina
|align=left|Independent
|
|12.16%
|-
|style="background-color:"|
|align=left|Dmitry Novikov
|align=left|Yabloko
|
|7.41%
|-
|style="background-color:"|
|align=left|Sergey Yeliseyev
|align=left|Liberal Democratic Party
|
|5.18%
|-
|style="background-color:"|
|align=left|Marina Ponyakhina
|align=left|A Just Russia
|
|4.69%
|-
| colspan="5" style="background-color:#E9E9E9;"|
|- style="font-weight:bold"
| colspan="3" style="text-align:left;" | Total
| 
| 100%
|-
| colspan="5" style="background-color:#E9E9E9;"|
|- style="font-weight:bold"
| colspan="4" |Source:
|
|}

2019

|-
! colspan=2 style="background-color:#E9E9E9;text-align:left;vertical-align:top;" |Candidate
! style="background-color:#E9E9E9;text-align:left;vertical-align:top;" |Party
! style="background-color:#E9E9E9;text-align:right;" |Votes
! style="background-color:#E9E9E9;text-align:right;" |%
|-
|style="background-color:"|
|align=left|Margarita Rusetskaya
|align=left|Independent
|
|28.61%
|-
|style="background-color:"|
|align=left|Roman Yuneman
|align=left|Independent
|
|28.36%
|-
|style="background-color:"|
|align=left|Vladislav Zhukovsky
|align=left|Communist Party
|
|24.76%
|-
|style="background-color:"|
|align=left|Pyotr Vikulin
|align=left|Communists of Russia
|
|7.83%
|-
|style="background-color:"|
|align=left|Ilya Galibin
|align=left|Liberal Democratic Party
|
|4.11%
|-
|style="background-color:"|
|align=left|Aleksey Tsyba
|align=left|A Just Russia
|
|3.43%
|-
| colspan="5" style="background-color:#E9E9E9;"|
|- style="font-weight:bold"
| colspan="3" style="text-align:left;" | Total
| 
| 100%
|-
| colspan="5" style="background-color:#E9E9E9;"|
|- style="font-weight:bold"
| colspan="4" |Source:
|
|}

References

Moscow City Duma districts